The men's parallel bars event, part of the gymnastics competition at the 2014 Asian Games in Incheon, South Korea was held between 21 and 25 September 2014 at the Namdong Gymnasium.

Schedule
All times are Korea Standard Time (UTC+09:00)

Results

Qualification

Final

References

Qualification
Final

External links
Official website

Artistic Men parallel bars